Princess Sakura, Princess Cherry Blossom, Sakura Hime, Sakura-hime, or Sakurahime may refer to:

 Konohanasakuya-hime, a Japanese goddess symbolized by the cherry blossom

Fictional characters
 Princess Sakura, a protagonist of the manga series Tsubasa: Reservoir Chronicle
 Princess Tsubasa, also known as Sakura, another protagonist of the manga series Tsubasa: Reservoir Chronicle
 Princess Sakura, a character in the manga series Flame of Recca
 Princess Sakura, the main protagonist and title character of the manga series Sakura Hime: The Legend of Princess Sakura
 Princess Cherry Blossom, a character in the video game Sakura Samurai: Art of the Sword
 Sakura, a character in video game Fire Emblem Fates

See also
 Sakura (disambiguation)